This is an incomplete list of ambassadors from France to Austria.

To the Court of Vienna and the Holy Roman Emperor, King of Hungary 
 1702 – 1714 : War of the Spanish Succession
 1715 – 1717 : Charles-François de Vintimille du Luc
 1717 – 1724 : Jean-Baptiste Radiguet
 1724 – 1725 : Dieudonné Dumat
 1725 – 1728 : Armand de Vignerot du Plessis
 1728 – 1733 : François de Bussy
 1733 – 1735 : War of the Polish Succession
 1735 – 1737 : Jean-Gabriel de la Porte Dutheil
 1738 – 1739 : Gaston Pierre de Lévis
 1740 – 1748 : War of the Austrian Succession
 1749 – 1750 : Louis-Augustin Blondel
 1750 – 1753 :  Emmanuel-Dieudonné d’Hautefort
 1753 – 1757 : Henri Joseph Bouchard d'Esparbès de Lussan d'Aubeterre
 1757 – 1757 : Louis Charles César Le Tellier
 1757 – 1758 : Étienne François, duc de Choiseul
 1758 – 1761 : César Gabriel de Choiseul
 1761 – 1766 : Louis-Marie-Florent de Lomont, Duke of Châtelet
 1767 – 1770 : Jacques Aimeric Joseph de Durfort, marquis de Civrac
 1770 – 1770 : Louis Auguste Le Tonnelier de Breteuil
 1770 – 1771 : François-Michel Durand de Distroff
 1771 – 1774 : Louis-René-Édouard de Rohan-Guémené
 1774 – 1774 : Jean-François Géorgel
 1774 – 1783 : Louis Auguste Le Tonnelier de Breteuil (2nd term)
 1783 – 1792 : Emmanuel Marie Louis de Noailles
 1792 – 1800 : Wars of the French Revolution 
 February 1798 – 14 April 1798 : Jean-Baptiste Bernadotte
 1800 – 1801 : Géraud Duroc
 1801 – 1804 : Jean-Baptiste de Nompère de Champagny

To the Empire of Austria 
 1805 – 1806 : Alexandre-François de La Rochefoucauld
 1806 – 1809 : Antoine-François Andréossy
 1830 – 1832 : Nicolas Joseph Maison
 1841 – 1848 : Charles Joseph, comte de Flahaut
 1848 – April 1849 : Pascal Pierre Duprat
 April 1849 – September 1849 : Édouard de Lacour
 September 1849 – December 1849 : Gustave de Beaumont
 December 1849 – 1853 : Édouard de Lacour
 1853 – 1859 : François-Adolphe de Bourqueney
 1859 – 1861 : Lionel de Moustier
 1861 – 1870 : Agénor de Gramont

To the Monarchy of Austria-Hungary 
 July 1870 – August 1870 : Godefroi, prince de La Tour d'Auvergne-Lauraguais
 August 1870 –  March 1871 : Comte de Mosbourg
 March 1871 – September 1873 : Charles de Banneville
 September 1873 – May 1875 : Bernard d'Harcourt
 May 1875 – February 1879 : Melchior de Vogüé
February 1879 – April 1880 : Pierre Edmond Teisserenc de Bort
April 1880 – August 1883 : Comte Duchâtel
August 1883 – July 1886 : Comte Foucher de Careil
 July 1886 – November 1893 : Albert Decrais
 November 1893 – October 1897 : Henri-Auguste Lozé
 October 1897 – January 1907 : Jacques Frédéric de Reverseaux de Rouvrays
 January 1907 – May 1912 : Philippe Crozier
 May 1912 – August 1914 : Alfred Chilhaud-Dumaine
 World War I

To the Republic of Austria 

 April 1919 – February 1920 : Henri Allizé
 1920 – 1924 : Pierre Lefèvre-Pontalis
 1924 – 1926 : Maurice Delarüe Caron de Beaumarchais
 1926 – 1928 : Louis Pineton de Chambrun
 1928 – 1933 : Comte Clauzel
 1933 – march 1938 : Gabriel Puaux
 March 1938 – October 1938 : Jean Chauvel (consul general)
 October 1938 – December 1938 : Jacques Chartier (consul general)
 World War II
 1945 – 1946 : Gabriel Padovani
 1946 – 1946 : Louis de Monicault
 1946 – 1950 : Général Antoine Béthouart
 1950 – 1955 : Jean Payart
 1955 – 1955 : Jean Chauvel
 1955 – 1958 : François Seydoux de Clausonne
 1958 – 1961 : Étienne de Crouy-Chanel
 1961 – 1963 : René Brouillet
 1963 – 1968 : Louis Roché
 1968 – 1973 : François Leduc
 1973 – 1975 : Augustin Jordan
 November 1973 – November 1975 : Augustin Jordan
 November 1975 – August 1978 : Georges Gaucher
 August 1978 	– May 1981 : Jacques Schricke
 May 1981 − May 1983 : Raymond Bressier
 May 1983 − April 1985 : Jean Audibert
 April 1985 − December 1988 : François-Régis Bastide
 December 1988 − June 1991 : Jean-François Noiville
 June 1991 − 1996 : André Roderic Lewin
 1996 − 1997 : Mme France de Harting
 January 1998 − October 2001 : Jean Cadet
 November 2001 − January 2005 : Alain Catta
 January 2005 − September 2008 : Pierre Viaux
 October 2008 – March 2012 : Philippe Carré
 March 2012 – June 2014 : Stéphane Gompertz
 June 2014 – June 2017 : Pascal Teixeira da Silva
 June 2017 – June 2020 : François Saint-Paul
 September 2020 – present : Gilles Pécout

References 
 1981 pp. Liste chronologique des ambassadeurs, La France en Autriche − Ambassade de France à Vienne 

Austria
France
Ambassador